Richard Guimond  (born 7 December 1951), professionally known as Richard Darbois, is a Canadian voice actor who specializes in French dubbing.

Darbois is a regular French voice for many actors, including Harrison Ford, Danny Glover, Richard Gere, Jeff Goldblum, Dan Aykroyd, and Patrick Swayze, as well as for Bill Murray, Arnold Schwarzenegger and Sylvester Stallone.

Darbois is also very present in the animation industry, standing out singularly by his playing and various vocal possibilities. He has participated in many works for Disney Studios, notably lending his voice to Buzz Lightyear in the Toy Story franchise and the series Buzz Lightyear of Star Command, Genie in Aladdin, Oogie Boogie in The Nightmare Before Christmas, Shan-Yu in Mulan, Bruce in Finding Nemo, Mr. Waternoose in Monsters, Inc.. He also lent his voice to Batman in several series and animated films of the 1990s (including Batman: The Animated Series) and Captain Harlock in the anime series Space Pirate Captain Harlock.

In the media, he is also known as the voice-over artist of the radio station NRJ and some brands for advertising.

Early life 
Richard Darbois is the son of comedian Olivier Guimond and singer Jeanne-d'Arc Charlebois.

In 1955, his parents separated and his mother left for a career in Europe, accompanied by her children, where she took the artist name of Jeanne Darbois, a surname that her children would adopt.

Career 
In the 1970s, at the start of his acting career, Richard Darbois appeared in several soft erotic films, then in pornographic films; however, he was dubbed in the latter for the hard shots. He then turned to dubbing, where he professionalized. Within the post-synchronization, Richard Darbois is distinguished by a very recognizable voice, of which he is able to modify the bass as well as the treble (though his normal voice is still very deep, even cavernous).

Darbois has since been in many French versions for films and television series through animation. He doubles Harrison Ford, Richard Gere, Danny Glover and Jeff Goldblum and has repeatedly dubbed Bill Murray, Patrick Swayze, Arnold Schwarzenegger, Liam Neeson, George Clooney and even Sylvester Stallone (during a certain period, Alain Dorval, the usual voice of Stallone, was at odds with the studios, following union demands).

He also modulates his voice according to the actors he doubles; he retains his normal voice for Harrison Ford (who also has a very deep voice), while giving a much less serious voice to Richard Gere and Jeff Goldblum and even less serious to Bill Murray. Danny Glover, on the other hand, has the same voice as Harrison Ford, but with a slight black African-American accent. Darbois also kept his normal voice for Richard Chamberlain, Arnold Schwarzenegger, Michael Ironside and Keith Richards, who played Edward Teague in Pirates of the Caribbean: At World's End.

Darbois currently lives in Guadeloupe with his wife, with whom he has a son. However, he continues to record announcements for NRJ Radio, and the firm has set up a studio for him there.

Filmography

Dubbing roles

Cinema 
Harrison Ford
 Blade Runner (1982) (Rick Deckard)
 Indiana Jones and the Last Crusade (1989) (Indiana Jones)
 Patriot Games (1992) (Jack Ryan)
 Clear and Present Danger (1994) (Jack Ryan)
 Air Force One (1997) (President James Marshall)
 K-19: The Widowmaker (2002) (Captain Alexis Vostrikov)
 Sneakers (Mother)
 Pearl Harbor (Captain Thurman)
 50 First Dates (Doctor Keats)
 Casper (Doctor Raymond Stantz)
 Ghostbusters (Doctor Raymond Stantz)
 Ghostbusters II (Doctor Raymond Stantz)
 Blues Brothers 2000 (Elwood Blues)
 Unconditional Love (Max Beasley)
 My Stepmother Is an Alien (Steven Mills)
 Gremlins (Deputy Brent, Mister Jones)
 Flubber (Chester Hoenicker)
 The Substitute (Jonathan Shale)
 Starman (Starman)
 Highlander (The Kurgan)
 Blue Steel (Nick Mann)
 Alien 3 (Aaron)
 RoboCop 3 (RoboCop)
 Ghost (Sam Wheat)
 Spaceballs (Barf)
 Man of the House (Jack)
 One Fine Day (Jack)
 From Dusk till Dawn (Seth Gecko)
 Taps (Cadet Captain David Shawn)
 Wishmaster series (Djinn)
 Platoon (Captain Harris)
 What Lies Beneath (Doctor Norman Spencer)
 The Fugitive (Doctor Richard Kimble)
 Random Hearts (Sergeant William 'Dutch' Van Den Broeck)
 Hollywood Homicide (Joe Gavilan)
 Witness (John Book)
 Sabrina (Linus Larrabee)
 Presumed Innocent (Rusty Sabich)
 The Devil's Own (Tom O'Meara)
 No Mercy (Eddie Jillette)
 Chicago (Billy Flynn)
 The Jackal (Declan Mulqueen)
 Pretty Woman (Edward Lewis)
 Unfaithful (Edward "Ed" Sumner)
 Runaway Bride (Homer Eisenhower "Ike" Graham)
 Final Analysis (Doctor Isaac Barr)
 Red Corner (Jack Moore)
 The Mothman Prophecies (John Klein)
 Dr. T & the Women (Doctor T)
 Intersection (Vincent Eastman)
 Autumn in New York (Will Keane)
 The Color Purple (Mister)
 Bat*21 (Captain Bartholomew Clark)
 Lethal Weapon series (Sergeant Roger Murtaugh)
 Beloved (Paul D.)
 The Money Pit (Max Beissart)
 Jurassic Park (Doctor Ian Malcolm)
 The Lost World: Jurassic Park (Doctor Ian Malcolm)
 Cats & Dogs (Professor Brody)
 Holy Man (Ricky Hayman)
 The Fly (Seth Brundle)
 Silverado ('Slick' Calvin Stanhope)
 Scooby-Doo (N' Goo Tuana)
 Doctor Welker (Dr Paul Welker)
 The Right Stuff (John Glenn)
 Betrayed (Michael Carnes)
 After Hours (Thomas 'Tom' Schorr)
 Police Academy (Kyle Blankes)
 Hero (Bernard "Bernie" LaPlante)
 Hook (Hook)
 I Love You to Death (Harlan James)
 Total Recall (Richter)
 Blown Away (Ryan Gaerity)
 Willow (Madmartigan)
 Blind Date (David Bedford)
 The Silence of the Lambs (Buffalo Bill)
 Ransom (Agent Lonnie Hawkins)
 Gone in 60 Seconds (Detective Roland Castlebeck)
 Masters of the Universe (He-Man)
 Wild Things (Kenneth Bowden)
 Space Jam (Bill Murray)
 Rushmore (Herman J. Blume)
 Groundhog Day (Phil Connors)
 Three Fugitives (Dan Lucas)
 Beetlejuice (Otho)

Animation

Video games

References

External links 
 
 
 

1951 births
Living people
Canadian emigrants to France
Canadian male film actors
Canadian male television actors
Canadian male video game actors
Canadian male voice actors
French male film actors
French male television actors
French male video game actors
French male voice actors
French people of Canadian descent
French Quebecers
Male actors from Montreal
Naturalized citizens of France